The 1940 Yukon general election was held on 25 November 1940 to elect the three members of the Yukon Territorial Council.

Yukon Territorial Council
The council was non-partisan, and had merely an advisory role to the federally appointed Commissioner.

Members
Dawson - Andrew Taddie
Mayo - Richard Lee
Whitehorse - Willard "Deacon" Phelps

References

1940
1940 elections in Canada
Election
November 1940 events